Doble Sucre Potosi GP Cemento Fancesa  was a cycling race held annually in Bolivia. It was part of the UCI America Tour in category 2.2.

Winners

References

Cycle races in Bolivia
UCI America Tour races
Recurring sporting events established in 2000
Recurring sporting events disestablished in 2010
Autumn events in Bolivia
2000 establishments in Bolivia
2010 disestablishments in Bolivia
Defunct cycling races in Bolivia